NGC 103 is a small open cluster. It is partially visible in an 8" amateur telescope under moderately light polluted skies. It is roughly 4600 light-years from the Sun.

References

External links

0103
Open clusters
Cassiopeia (constellation)